Killam is a surname. Notable people with the surname include:

 Albert Clements Killam (1849–1908), Canadian lawyer
 Amasa Emerson Killam (1834–1922), Canadian politician
 Dorothy J. Killam (1900–1965), Canadian philanthropist
 Eva King Killam (1921–2006), American pharmacologist
 Frank Killam (1843–1911), Canadian politician
 Gordon Douglas Killam (1930–2020), Canadian scholar of African literature
 Izaak Walton Killam (1885–1955), Canadian financier
 Joyce Carman Killam (1913–1912), Canadian children's writer
 Mabel Killam (1884–1960), Canadian artist
 Taran Killam (born 1982), American comic actor
 Thomas Killam (1802–1868), Canadian ship builder